Suzy Lee (born February 9, 1974) is a Korean picture-book illustrator and author. She is critically acclaimed as an artist who explores the pleasures and tensions that lie between reality and fantasy. She is also known for her remarkable achievements in the field of wordless picture books, or silent books. She gained global attention for her three works – Mirror (2003), Wave (2008), and Shadow (2010), known collectively as "The Border Trilogy" – using the center binding of the pages of a book as a means to create a narrative crossing the boundaries between reality and fantasy. Wave and Shadow were respectively named by The New York Times as Best Illustrated Children's Books of 2008 and 2010. Wave was also awarded the gold medal for Original Art by the Society of Illustrators in 2008. In 2016, Suzy Lee was shortlisted for the Hans Christian Andersen Award, regarded as the Nobel Prize for children's literature, an award which she received in 2022. Lee has received a number of other prestigious awards from around the world including the FNLIJ Award Luís Jardim for the Best Book without Text in 2008 and the Boston Globe-Horn Book Award for Excellence in Children's Literature in 2013.

Life 
Lee was born and raised in Seoul. She received a Bachelor of Fine arts in Painting from Seoul National University in 1996. She started out her professional career as an illustrator, but she soon became fascinated with picture books upon encountering the world of artists’ books. She decided to pursue graduate studies, receiving her Master's in Book Arts from Camberwell College of Arts in London, England in 2001. The following year, she published her first book, Alice in Wonderland, which was also her final graduation project. Since then, she has published over thirty books. Lee continues to expand her artistic boundaries, particularly through collaboration with other artists and artistic fields. This is evidenced in her latest ventures including organizing projects as the leader of the artist collective, Vacance Project, and illustrating Dream of Becoming Water, a book bringing life to the song of the same title by Korean singer-songwriter Lucid Fall.

Career 
Suzy Lee made her debut as a picture-book artist with Alice in Wonderland, which was the final project for her master's program. She participated in the Bologna Children's Book Fair with a dummy of the book and pitched it to publishers, eventually signing a deal with the Italian publishing house Corraini Edizioni in 2002. La Revanche des Lapins, for which she was selected for the Illustrator's Exhibition at the Bologna Children's Book Fair in 2002, was published in Switzerland the following year and recognized as one of "The Most Beautiful Swiss Books." Lee gained attention in the picture-book world for the publication of the series of three books, Mirror (2003), Wave (2008), and Shadow (2010), complemented by The Border Trilogy, a manual to the series sharing the details of her creative process and approach to picture-books. Beginning with her solo exhibition highlighting "The Border Trilogy" at the Museo d’Arte Moderna di Bologna (MAMBo) in Italy, Suzy Lee has been engaging with readers and audiences across the world through exhibitions and book fairs held in countries including the United States, Swenden, Germany, Brazil, Spain, China, Singapore, Japan, India, Mexico, Italy, France and Korea. In 2013, she illustrated the official poster for the Library of Congress National Book Festival. Later in the same year, she was honored with the Boston Globe-Horn Book Award for Open This Little Book. In 2016, she was shortlisted for the Hans Christian Andersen Award in recognition of the literary and aesthetic innovation qualities of her works. She received the award in 2022.In 2019, she received the 60th Korean Publishing Culture Award and selected for the IBBY Honour List for River, a book inspired by a personal story of her dog. She has founded Hintoki Press, an independent publishing house, through which she has directly published experimental works such as Sim Cheong and The Magic Jar. She also leads the project group, Vacance, creating and publishing books with diverse themes and novel artistic expressions in collaboration with other picture-book artists. Through varied efforts including independent publishing and group exhibitions, Lee is continuously exploring ways to diversify, broaden, and deepen engagement with readers.

Style 
For Suzy Lee, the charm of picture-books lies in their power as a medium to convey the simplest truths in a simple yet refined manner, and she is thereby carrying out diverse experiments in the field of wordless picture books to demonstrate this charm. She uses a wide variety of materials from pen, pencil, charcoal, watercolor to acrylic, and different artistic practices including collage and print-making, depending on the book she is working on. She particularly enjoys using charcoal. Suzy Lee's books often explore the pleasures and tensions that lie between reality and fantasy. For Lee, the center binding fold of the double spread-page of a book is not a limitation. In fact, in her "border trilogy", she utilizes this center line as a border between reality and fantasy and transformed the physical border of the book into a border of perception, thereby expanding the realm of imagination.

Awards 

 2022 Hans Christian Andersen Award Illustration
 2020 Open Book Awards of Best Books Children and Young Adults Category, Taiwan - Wave
2020 The 60th Korean Publishing Culture Awards for Young People's Literature – River
 2020 IBBY Honour List – River
 2016 Shortlisted for the Hans Christian Andersen Award
 2014 Please Touch Museum Annual Book Award, Philadelphia, U.S.A. – Open This Little Book
 2014 Best Children's Books of the Year, Children's Book Committee at Bank Street College of Education, U.S.A. – Open This Little Book
 2013 Picture Book Honor Winner, Boston Globe–Horn Book Award for Excellence in Children's Literature, U.S.A.- Open This Little Book
 2010 Best Illustrated Album (Premio Album Ilustrado), El Gremio de Librerías de Madrid, Spain – Wave
 2010 FNLIJ Award Luís Jardim – The Best Book without Text (Prêmio FNLIJ Luís Jardim – O Melhor Livro de Imagem), FNLIJ (Fundação Nacional do Livro Infantil e Juvenil), Brazil – Wave
 2010 The Best Illustrated Children's Books, The New York Times, U.S.A. – Shadow
 2008 The Best Illustrated Children's Books, The New York Times, U.S.A. – Wave
 2008 Best Books, Publishers Weekly, U.S.A. – Wave
 2008 Best Books, School Library Journal, U.S.A. – Wave
 2008 The Best Books of the Year, Kirkus Review, U.S.A. – Wave
 2008 Gold Medal, Original Art Award, Society of Illustrators, U.S.A. – Wave
 2008 Notable Children's Books in the Language Arts, Children's Literature Assembly of the National Council of Teachers of English, U.S.A. – The Zoo
 2005 The Illustrators Exhibition, Bologna Children's Book Fair, Italy – The Black Bird
 2003 The Most Beautiful Swiss Books, Swiss Federal Office of Culture, Switzerland – La Revanche des Lapins
 2002 The Illustrators Exhibition, Bologna Children's Book Fair, Italy – La Revanche des Lapins

Works 

 2020 Fart Match (Hintoki Press) 
 2020 Hill Over Hill (Hintoki Press) 
 2019 Sim Cheong (Hintoki Press) 
 2019 The Magic Jar (Hintoki Press) 
 2019 The Boy Who Bought the Shade Under the Tree (Hintoki Press) 
 2018 River (BIR Publishing Co.) 
 2018 Lines (Chronicle Books) 
 2018 The Border Trilogy (Corraini Edizioni) 
 2010 Shadow(Chronicle Books) 
 2008 Wave (Chronicle Books) 
 2008 My Bright Atelier (BIR Publishing Co.) 
 2007 The Black Bird (Gilbut Children Publishing Co.) 
 2006 Action Korean Alphabet (Gilbut Children Publishing Co.) 
 2004 The Zoo(BIR Publishing Co.) 
 2003 Mirror (Edizioni Corraini) 
 2003 La Revanche des Lapins (La Joie de Lire) 
 2002 Alice in Wonderland (Corraini Edizioni)  *Currently housed in the Tate Modern’s Collection of Artist Books (London, U.K.)

Collaborations with other authors 

 2022 See You Someday Soon with Pat Zietlow Miller (Roaring Brook Press) ISBN 9781250221100
 2020 The Yulu Linen with Cao Wenxuan (Bear Books) 
 2020 Dream of Becoming Water with Lucid Fall (Chungaram Media) 
 2017 This Beautiful Day with Richard Jackson (Atheneum) 
 2015 Ask Me with Bernard Waber (Houghton Mifflin) 
 2013 Open This Little Book by Jesse Klausmeier (Chronicle Books) 
 2013 Love You, My Baby with Mun Hye-jin (BIR Publishing Co.) 
 2008 Shadow is My Friend with Park Jung-Sun (Chondung Books) 
 2008 Open the Door! with Park Jung-Sun (BIR Publishing Co) 
 2005 The Naked Painters with Moon Seung-Yeon (Chondung Books)

References

External links 

 
 Personal Blog "curiouser and curiouser!" (egloos.com)
 “Picturebooks On a Roll”, Docu On, KBS (Korean Broadcasting System), October 30, 2020
 "The Real Reason Why I Want My Children to Love Books, Sebasi Talk, CBS TV, July 20, 2020
 "Suzy Lee’s Lines Workshop”, Japan Women’s University, February 10, 2019
 “Between Reality and Fantasy – Picturebook Artist Lee Suzy,” Arts Avenue,”, Arirang TV, August 4, 2016 (9’25’’-15’54’’)
 "Suzy Lee: 2013 National Book Festival,” National Book Festival, Library of Congress, September 22, 2013
 "Grown-ups Read Picture Books: The Picture books of Suzy Lee,” C!talk Seoul, June 8, 2013
 "Between the Pages: Illustrated Books and Artists’ Books – A Talk with Suzy Lee,” Festivaletteratura, September 11, 2009
 "A Wave of My Own,” Festivaletteratura, September 11, 2009
 "Seven Questions Over Breakfast with Suzy Lee," 7 Impossible Things Before Breakfast, August 12, 2008
 "Narrative of a Book Artist: Suzy Lee," Behind the Books
 “Picture book Artists and Their power to Breakthrough: Suzy Lee," Saturday Special, The Hankyoreh, November 27, 2020

1974 births
Living people
People from Seoul
Seoul National University
South Korean women illustrators
South Korean children's book illustrators